Hortense Allart de Méritens (pseudonym Prudence de Saman L'Esbatx; 7 September 1801 – 28 February 1879) was an Italian-French feminist writer and essayist. Her novels, based on her adventures, did not have much success, except for Les enchantements de Prudence, Avec George Sand ("The Enchantment of Prudence, with George Sand") (1873), which had a succès de scandale.

Early years and education
Allart was born in Milan in 1801. Her French father was Nicolas-Jean-Gabriel Allart and her French mother was the writer Marie-Françoise Gay who had translated the works of the English gothic author Ann Radcliffe. Her maternal aunt was the writer Sophie Gay and her cousin was Delphine de Girardin. In 1817, her father died. She had received what was considered to be a good education.

Career
Allart was an enthusiastic supporter of the vanquished Napoleon and in 1819 she wrote to Henri Gatien Bertrand and volunteered to travel to Saint Helena to nurse the ex-emperor who was ill. Bertrand later offered her a job as a governess and commented that he thought that Napoleon would have fallen in love with her if she had been successful in travelling to be his nurse. Napoleon and her mother died, leaving her an orphan at the age of 20. For some two years she worked as a governess in the household of General Bertrand, where she met the Comte de Sampayo, a Portuguese gentleman. She became his mistress, and in 1826 gave birth to his son, Marcus. Sampayo abandoned her before she gave birth.

Allart's first work was published in 1821. At this time she was living with the Countess Regnault de Saint-Jean d'Angely, who became a close friend when she confessed to also wanting to go and tend to the ailing Napoleon. The Countess introduced Allart to two suitors: the economist Hippolyte Passy and the poet Pierre-Jean de Béranger. Beranger and Passy were to be life-long friends. Allart traveled to Florence, where, after a time, she appears to have had an affair with Gino Capponi, who had been interested in a book entitled La Conjuration d'Amboise, which she had published when she was 21. Another early work of hers was a volume of Letters to George Sand, with whose moral and religious principles she much sympathised, and who, later on, pronounced her to be 'one of the glories of her sex'. Allart was a lifelong lover of George Sand, but they had an open relationship. In 1829, Allart was in Rome on a visit to her sister. There, she met François-René de Chateaubriand and they became lovers. Within a few weeks, he proceeded to Paris, and Allart followed him there, taking an apartment in the Rue d’Enfer. In England, she met Henry Bulwer Lytton, afterwards Lord Dalling, and they became lovers, which Allart told Chateaubrian on her return, under notions of probity, and being faithful in her temporary unions. In 1843, she married the French aristocrat Napoléon Louis Frédéric Corneille de Méritens de Malvézie but she left him the following year.

Allart, a notable figure in Paris' intellectual circles, lived several miles outside Paris with her books which she called her "true lovers". She did not recommend that women should abandon men, in fact in her novel Settimia her heroine enjoys her male lovers but is not defined by them but by her lack of interdependence, her intellectual maturity and her children. This was the life that Allart lived, surviving without having to rely on a supportive family. She argued that women needed political reform of their lot and if this meant that women needed to abandon the two-parent family then this would be acceptable. Allart foresaw a world where society was not democratic or organised by men, but a meritocratic society run by women and men of higher abilities than the general population. She professed herself a Protestant, and had a kind of religiosity, however hazy; Allart was loyal, generous and true to her lovers, who usually became her friends. A single mother of two sons, Allart wrote that her sons were not accidents and this was the life she had chosen.

Allart recorded her adventures in her books, veiling them only slightly as fiction. Her novel Jerome (1829), for example, is a thinly disguised account of her experiences with Sampayo, whom she portrayed in the book as a celibate Roman prelate. With the exception of Les enchantements de Prudence, Avec George Sand (1873), which had a succès de scandale, none of her novels had much success.

Allart died in Montlhéry in 1879 and is buried in the cemetery at Bourg-la-Reine.

Selected works

 Essai sur la religion intérieure, Paris, 1824
 Lettres sur les ouvrages de Madame de Staël, Paris, Bossange, 1824
 Gertrude, Paris, Dupont, 1828 
 Jerome ou Le jeune prélat, 1829
 Sextus, ou le Romain des Maremmes ; suivi d'Essais détachés sur l'Italie, Heideloff et Campe, 1832 
 L'indienne, C. Vimont, 1833 
 Settimia, Bruxelles, A. Wahlen, 1836
 La femme et la démocratie de nos temps, Paris, Delaunay et Pinard, 1836 
 Histoire de la république de Florence, Paris, Delloye, 1843
 Études diverses, Volumes 1 2 & 3, Renault, 1850–1851 
 Novum organum ou sainteté philosophique, Paris, Garnier frères, 1857
 Essai sur l’histoire politique depuis l'invasion des barbares jusqu’en 1848, 1857
 Clémence, impr. de E. Dépée (Sceaux), 1865 
 Les enchantements de Prudence, Avec George Sand, Paris, Michel Lévy frères, 1873 
 Les nouveaux enchantements, Paris, C. Lévy, 1873 
 Derniers enchantements, Paris, M. Lévy, 1874
 Lettres inédites à Sainte-Beuve (1841–1848) avec une introduction des notes, Éd. Léon Séché, Paris, Société du Mercure de France, 1908 
 Lettere inedite a Gino Capponi, Genova, Tolozzi, 1961
 Mémoires de H.L.B. Henry Lytton Bulwer, Houston : University of Houston, 1960–1969
 Nouvelles lettres à Sainte-Beuve, 1832–1864; les lettres de la collection Lovenjoul, Genève, Librairie Droz, 1965
Source: Uffenbeck, L.A. (1957), The life and writings of Hortense Allart, University of Wisconsin

Further reading
  Léon Séché, Hortense Allart de Méritens dans ses rapports avec Chateaubriand, Béranger, Lamennais, Sainte-Beuve, G. Sand, Mme d'Agoult, Paris, Mercure de France, 1908
  Jacques Vier, La comtesse d'Agoult et Hortense Allart de Meritens sous le Second Empire d'après une correspondence inédite, Paris,  Lettres modernes, 1960
  Juliette Decreus, Henry Bulwer-Lytton et Hortense Allart, d'après des documents inédits, Paris, M.J. Minard, 1961
  Maddalena Bertelà, Hortense Allart entre Madame de Staël et George Sand, ou, Les femmes et démocratie, Pisa : Edizioni ETS, 1999
 Helynne Hollstein Hansen, Hortense Allart : the woman and the novelist, Lanham, Md. : University Press of America, 1998
 Leslie Ruth Rabine, The other side of the ideal : women writers of mid-nineteenth-century France (George Sand, Daniel Stern, Hortense Allart, and Flora Tristan), Thèse de doctorat, 1974
 Lorin A. Uffenbeck, The life and writings of Hortense Allart (1801–79), [s.l.s.n.] 1957
  Petre Cirueanu, Hortense Allart e Anna Woodcock; con lettere inedite'', Genova, Tolozzi, 1961

References

Bibliography

1801 births
1879 deaths
19th-century Italian writers
19th-century French writers
French feminist writers
Writers from Milan
19th-century French women writers
19th-century women writers
19th-century Italian women writers
19th-century pseudonymous writers
Pseudonymous women writers